Jingdezhen North railway station is a railway station in Zhushan District, Jingdezhen, Jiangxi, China. It is an intermediate stop on the Jiujiang–Quzhou railway. It opened on 28 December 2017.

References 

Railway stations in Jiangxi
Railway stations in China opened in 2017